Gláuber Siqueira dos Santos Lima (born 22 May 2000), commonly known as Gláuber, is a Brazilian footballer who currently plays for Al-Nasr.

Career statistics

Club

Notes

Honours
Al Nasr
UAE League Cup: 2019–20

References

External links

2000 births
Living people
Brazilian footballers
Association football defenders
UAE Pro League players
Botafogo de Futebol e Regatas players
Al-Nasr SC (Dubai) players
Expatriate footballers in the United Arab Emirates
Brazilian expatriate sportspeople in the United Arab Emirates